Four Courts Press is an independent Irish academic publishing house, with its office at Malpas Street, Dublin 8, Ireland. 

Founded in 1970 by Michael Adams, who died in February 2009, its early publications were primarily theological, notably the English translation of the Navarre Bible. From 1992 it expanded into publishing peer-reviewed works in Celtic Studies, Medieval Studies and Ecclesiastical History, and then into Modern History, Art, Literature and Law. As of late 2020, Four Courts Press had around 500 titles in print and publishing around 50 new works each year.

References

Companies based in Dublin (city)
Publishing companies established in 1970
Publishing companies of Ireland